VKS may refer to:

 Russian Aerospace Forces, romanization of Russian name as Vozdushno-kosmicheskiye sily, or VKS               
 V. K. Sasikala (born 1954), Indian businesswoman known as VKS
 Vanuatu Kaljoral Senta, national cultural institution of Vanuatu
 VKS sniper rifle, Russian rifle